Cherokee Strip, also known as Fighting Marshal or The Indian Nation, is a 1940 American Western film directed by Lesley Selander and written by Bernard McConville and Norman Houston. The film stars Richard Dix, Florence Rice, William "Bill" Henry, Victor Jory, Andy Clyde and George E. Stone. The film was released on October 11, 1940, by Paramount Pictures.

Plot

Cast 
Richard Dix as Marshal Dave Lovell
Florence Rice as Kate Cross
William "Bill" Henry as Tom Cross
Victor Jory as Coy Barrett
Andy Clyde as Tex Crawford
George E. Stone as Abe Gabbert
Morris Ankrum as Hawk Barrett
Douglas Fowley as Alf Barrett
Addison Richards as Ned Strawn
Tom Tyler as Frank Lovell
Charles Trowbridge as Sen. Cross
William Haade as Grimes
Ray Teal as Smokey Lovell
Hal Taliaferro as Ben Blivens
Jack Rockwell as Ace Eastman

References

External links 
 

1940 films
American black-and-white films
1940s English-language films
Films directed by Lesley Selander
Paramount Pictures films
American Western (genre) films
1940 Western (genre) films
1940s American films